are the three special prizes awarded to top (Makuuchi) division sumo wrestlers for exceptional performance during a sumo honbasho or tournament. The prizes were first awarded in November 1947.

Criteria
All wrestlers in the top division below the rank of ōzeki are eligible. In order to be considered for a special prize a rikishi must make a kachi-koshi or majority of wins during the tournament. Among eligible rikishi, the prize winners are decided by a panel which includes press writers covering the tournament. There is no requirement that the prizes must be awarded, and it sometimes happens that one or more of the sanshō are not given. It is also common for an award to be awarded to more than one wrestler.

The three prizes are
, Outstanding Performance prize
, Fighting Spirit prize
, Technique prize

Typically the Ginō-shō is awarded to a wrestler or wrestlers who display the most skillful kimarite, or techniques; the Shukun-shō is awarded to a wrestler who defeats the yokozuna or the eventual tournament winner, or who otherwise displays outstanding performance relative to his rank; and the Kantō-shō to a wrestler who has most clearly fought tenaciously and to the best of his abilities. The Ginō-shō is considered the most prestigious, and is also the prize most often not awarded at all: in 1988, it was withheld for five consecutive tournaments. However each award is worth the same amount of money, two million yen.

It is a de facto standard that a newly promoted makuuchi wrestler who manages a 10-5 or better record in his first tournament will be awarded a sanshō, normally the Fighting Spirit prize. Similarly a wrestler newly promoted to the san'yaku ranks above maegashira who achieves a 10-5 record can expect a prize for his efforts.

There is no minimum or maximum limit to the number of sanshō that may be given. It is not uncommon for more than one wrestler to be awarded the same prize, and similarly there are occasions when one of the three sanshō titles is not awarded at all. For example, it is unlikely that the Shukun-shō will be awarded if the tournament is won 15-0 by a lone yokozuna.

Sanshō are announced before the final day's matches, sometimes with a condition that the wrestler must win their last bout to receive the prize. For example, Wakatakakage received the Technique Prize in March 2022 unconditionally but had to win his last match and take the championship with a 13-2 record to also receive the Outstanding Performance prize. He lost the match and even though he went on to win the championship in a playoff shortly afterwards, was not given the Shukun-shō.

At some tournaments as many as six sanshō were awarded in total (as in January 1992), while at others only one has been presented (most recently in March 2016). The September 2018 tournament marked the first time since the introduction of sanshō in 1947 that none of the three prizes were awarded at all.

Sanshō sweeps

On a few rare occasions, one wrestler has been awarded all three prizes simultaneously for his performance. This accolade has been given on only five separate occasions to five different wrestlers.

*record in bold indicates wrestler also took championship

In September 2001, Kotomitsuki, in his championship tournament, came very close to being the only wrestler to receive all three prizes twice, but the Fighting Spirit prize went to then maegashira Asashōryū.

Active special prize winners
This is a list of active wrestlers who have been awarded special prizes in their careers.
''Note: Yokozuna and Ōzeki are not awarded special prizes

See also
List of sumo record holders#Most special prizes

References

External links
Complete list of sanshō winners

Sumo terminology
Awards established in 1947
Japanese awards
Sports trophies and awards